Constance Philpitt Warner was a photographer who specialized in natural history photography and worked with the Smithsonian's National Zoo.

Biography
Warner was born in Hyattsville, Maryland on May 25, 1897. She studied nursing and worked as a nurse before turning to photography. Through her marriage to Dr. Carden Warner who was an eye specialist, she developed interest in the natural protections within the structure of animals' eyes that help prevent injury.

After 1947, Warner took up photography and photographed a wide variety of animals at zoos around the world, chiefly at the National Zoo where she was based. Warner's photographs are included in a collection of slides in the Smithsonian Institute Archives. In the 1965 annual report, the Smithsonian identified Warner as an "honorary collaborator" to recognize the photographic work she had done and offered to the zoo for use in publication. Her photography also appears in publications such as National Geographic magazine, Life, and Reader's Digest.

Warner died in Fort Lauderdale, Florida, on June 10, 1992.

References

20th-century American women photographers
Nature photographers
People from Hyattsville, Maryland
Smithsonian Institution people
1897 births
1992 deaths
20th-century American photographers
Photographers from Maryland